The Orlando Deanery Boychoir and Girls Choir are internationally renowned choirs based in Orlando, Florida. The choirs are open to youth of all religions and backgrounds in grades 3-12.

The Orlando Deanery Boychoir and Girls Choir are founded on European models and affiliated with the Royal School of Church Music in England. This music outreach program of the Cathedral Church of Saint Luke in downtown Orlando serves the community, nation and world. Performances include religious services, civic festivals, opera and symphony, charity concerts, private parties, weddings, conventions, TV commercials and Disney events, often with prominent local orchestras. While creating beautiful music of the highest standards, the choirs develop musicianship, vocal skills, teamwork, responsibility, leadership, courtesy, respect for other cultures, poise, and professionalism.

Tours play an integral part in their musical education, cultural enrichment, and outreach mission. As Cultural Ambassadors of the United States and the City of Orlando, the choirs have toured to Japan, England, Ireland, Wales, Canada, Vienna, Salzburg, Munich, Prague, Washington D.C., New York (and Carnegie Hall three times), Niagara Falls, New England, New Orleans, Florida, the Bahamas, and much of the Southeastern U.S. Tours are funded entirely by fundraising efforts and individual and corporate contributions. The boys and girls also attend Summer Choir Courses of the Royal School of Church Music in America.

The Orlando Deanery Boychoir and Girls Choir were issued a special invitation by First Lady Michele Obama, and performed in the White House in Washington D.C. for a 2-hour concert during the Christmas holidays of 2011. In August 2012, during London's Summer Olympics, they presented an Anglican Heritage Tour as the Choir-in-Residence for one week each at both St. Paul's Cathedral, London, and Christ Church Cathedral, Oxford UK. In 2014, they participated in the inaugural American Music Performance Nationals for Children’s and Youth Choirs in New York City at Carnegie Hall, which was their third trip to sing in Carnegie Hall. They also performed at Saint Thomas Episcopal Church in Manhattan and St Paul's Chapel near Ground Zero. In June 2017 they will be in residence at Washington National Cathedral (D.C.) to sing for three services with members of the Orlando Deanery Men's Choir, and St. Luke's Cathedral Choir and Choristers.

The choir has been under the direction of Canon Benjamin Lane, St. Luke's Cathedral Musician, since 1991.

History 
The Boychoir was founded in 1981 by then Cathedral Musician Murray Forbes Somerville. The Girls Choir was founded in 1987.

Recordings
 Glory to the Newborn King (Christmas Carols)
 Prayer for Peace (International Tour selections - Europe)
 Come, Let Us Sing (Classical and modern anthems)
 Angels We Have Heard on High (Carols for Advent and Christmas)
 Lift Thine Eyes (Classical and modern anthems)
 Feel the Spirit (Combined Choirs)
 O Gladsome Light (Classical and modern anthems)
 Evenings in England (Anglican Heritage Tour selections - England)

References

External links 
 Cathedral Church of St. Luke
 Deanery Boychoir
 

Boys' and men's choirs
Musical groups from Orlando, Florida
Musical groups established in 1981
1981 establishments in Florida
Men in the United States